David Maxwell Britt (3 January 1917 – 5 May 2009) was a North Carolina politician and jurist who served as Speaker of the North Carolina House of Representatives, as one of the original judges of the North Carolina Court of Appeals, and finally as a justice of the North Carolina Supreme Court. He retired from the bench in 1982.

Born in McDonald, North Carolina, he was the brother of federal judge W. Earl Britt. Britt studied law at Wake Forest University and then passed the bar exam, even though he left law school a few classes short of graduation.

Britt represented Robeson County in the North Carolina House of Representatives from 1958 until 1967, when Gov. Dan K. Moore appointed him to the new Court of Appeals. As a legislator, Britt helped reform the state's judicial system, including creating the state Court of Appeals and state District Courts.

Britt was elected to the state Supreme Court in 1978, succeeding I. Beverly Lake, Sr., and served through 1982. He then joined the Raleigh law firm of Bailey & Dixon.

References

1917 births
2009 deaths
People from Robeson County, North Carolina
Wake Forest University alumni
Members of the North Carolina House of Representatives
North Carolina Court of Appeals judges
Justices of the North Carolina Supreme Court
Speakers of the North Carolina House of Representatives
North Carolina lawyers
20th-century American judges
20th-century American politicians
20th-century American lawyers